Richard Clough Anderson Sr. (January 12, 1750 – October 16, 1826) was an American lawyer, soldier, politician, and surveyor from Virginia.

Revolutionary War 
He was chosen to be a captain in the Hanover County, 5th Virginia Regiment on January 29, 1776. Anderson fought in the battles of Brandywine and Germantown. He crossed the Delaware River with George Washington. He was aide-de-camp to Lafayette at the Battle of Yorktown. After the Siege of Savannah, was on board the Wasp when Casimir Pulaski was taken north to be treated for the mortal wound he received. He attended Pulaski in his last hours and received from him his sword as an evidence of friendship. At the end of the war, Anderson was promoted to Lieutenant colonel.

Later years 
In 1788 he was a member of the state convention, and in 1793 a presidential elector. He was the principal surveyor of the Virginia Military District from 1783 until 1819. Anderson Township is named after him, as is Clough Creek. His first wife was Elizabeth Clark, sister of George Rogers Clark and William Clark. His second wife was Sarah Marshall (1779–1854), a cousin of John Marshall, the fourth Chief Justice of the United States. He is the father of Richard Clough Anderson Jr., Charles Anderson (27th governor of Ohio), William Marshall Anderson, and Robert Anderson (who surrendered to Confederate forces at Fort Sumter). He is the great grandfather of Larz Anderson, an American diplomat involved in foreign affairs, who had the Larz Anderson House built for him and his wife Isabel Weld Perkins, which was bequeathed to the Society of Cincinnati as their international headquarters. He is the father-in-law of Allen Latham who helped him with surveying and administered his estate. He was a charter member of the Society of Cincinnati. Their home near Louisville was known as "Soldiers' Retreat."

References

Books
 Anderson, Edward L., The Andersons of Gold Mine, Hanover County, Virginia, 1913.
 Anderson, Edward L., Soldier And Pioneer: a Biographical Sketch of Lt.-Col. Richard C. Anderson of the Continental Army. New York: G.P. Putnam's Sons, 1879.
 "Anderson, Richard Clough." Kentucky Encyclopedia. John E. Kleber, Ed. University Press of Kentucky, 1992, p. 21.
 Hill, Edwin C. The Historical Register: A Biographical Record of the Men of Our Time Who Have Contributed to the Making of America. New York: 1919.

Virginia militiamen in the American Revolution
1750 births
1826 deaths
American surveyors